Caroline Morris (born 1974) is a British actress who played the part of the companion Erimem in a range of audio dramas by Big Finish Productions based on the BBC television series Doctor Who.

As well as playing Erimem, Morris also appeared in Zagreus as Mary Elson, the Bernice Summerfield adventure The Kingdom of the Blind as 26 and the Sapphire and Steel story Perfect Day as Jennifer.

Erimem
The Eye of the Scorpion (2001)
The Church and the Crown (2002)
No Place Like Home (2002), a one-episode Doctor Who audio story given away free with an issue of Doctor Who Magazine
Nekromanteia (2003)
The Axis of Insanity (2004)
The Roof of the World (2004)
Three's A Crowd (2005)
The Council Of Nicaea (2005)
The Veiled Leopard (2006)
The Kingmaker (2006)
Son of the Dragon (2007)
The Mind's Eye & Mission of the Viyrans (2007)
The Bride of Peladon (2008)

References 

Living people
English voice actresses
1974 births